Bolot Beishenaliev  (June 25, 1937 — November 18, 2002) was a Soviet cinematographer, film and theater actor. People's Artist of Kyrgyzstan. Father of actor Aziz Beyshenaliyev.

Beyshenaliyev studied at the studio of the Kyrgyz State Theater of Opera and Ballet, graduating in 1957, and at the Aleksandr Ostrovsky Institute of Theater Art in Tashkent until 1963. He subsequently worked as an assistant director at Kyrgyzfilm.

The actor’s first starring role was of Duishen, in Andrei Konchalovsky’s The First Teacher (1965), adapted from a novella by Chingiz Aitmatov. Beyshenaliev portrayed the passionate Bolshevik whose unshakeable convictions border on fanaticism. The international success of The First Teacher brought the actor several notable roles, among them the, Tatar khan in Andrei Tarkovsky’s Andrei Rublev (1966) and the Red Army soldier Chingiz in Hungarian director Miklós Jancsó’s The Red and the White (1967).

Ali Khamraev cast Beyshenaliev in his controversial contemporary drama White, White Storks (1966). The actor subsequently appeared in dozens of Russian, Kyrgyz, Kazakh, Uzbek, Mongolian, and Czech films of all genres, often playing stoic men and occasionally heroic characters, for example, in the Ukrainian World War II blockbuster Where Is 042? as the Yakut survivor Nomokonov.
Among Beyshenaliev’s later roles are the lead in Ardak Amirkulov’s historical epic The Fall of Otrar (1991) and the village senior in Aleksei Balabanov’s Kafka adaptation The Castle (1994). His final performance was in Dalmira Tilepbergenova’s short film The Falcon’s Hood (2001) as a disillusioned old man who sells birds on the market.

Selected filmography
 1964 — White Mountains as brother 
 1965 — The First Teacher as teacher Duishen 
 1966 — White, White Storks as Qayyum 
 1966 — Andrei Rublev as Tatar khan 
 1967 — The Red and the White as Chingiz 
 1968/1972 — Liberation as tankman 
 1969 — The Lanfier Colony as Goupi-swineherd 
 1972 — The Seventh Bullet as deserter 
 1972 — Hot Snow as Kasymov 
 1977 — Mama, I'm Alive as Chingiz
 1984 — TASS Is Authorized to Declare... as Lao, Chinese advisor 
 1994 — The Castle as village headman
 1999 — Mother  as old northerner

References

External links

1937 births
2002 deaths
People from Chüy Region
Kyrgyzstani male actors
Soviet actors